The M83 is a short metropolitan route in Greater Johannesburg, South Africa.

Route 
The M83 begins at the M68 and ends at the M70.

References 

Streets and roads of Johannesburg
Metropolitan routes in Johannesburg